Boushaki may refer to:

People
 Amine Boushaki (born 1982), Algerian judoka
 Brahim Boushaki (1912–1997), Algerian theologian
 Mohamed Seghir Boushaki (1869–1959), Algerian politician
 Mustapha Ishak Boushaki (born 1967), Algerian academician
 Sidi Boushaki (1394–1453), Algerian theologian
 Yahia Boushaki (1935–1960), Algerian politician and military

Places
 Yahia Boushaki, neighbourhood in Algiers
 Yahia Boushaki Boulevard, boulevard in Algeria
 Zawiyet Sidi Boushaki, a Sufi zawiya in Algeria

Science
 Poem of Sidi Boushaki, Book of Arabic grammar

See also
 Abu Ishaq

Arabic-language surnames
Boushaki family
People from Thénia
People from Thénia District
People from Boumerdès Province
Algerian people
Kabyle people